Qualification for the 1968 AFC Asian Cup. The winner of each group advances to the final tournament.

Zones

 * Withdrew

Central zone 

All matches held in Hong Kong.

Eastern zone 

All matches held in Republic of China.

Western zone 1
All the others withdrew, so  qualified automatically.

Western zone 2

All matches held in Burma.

Qualified teams

References 

Garin, Erik; Jovanovic, Bojan; Panahi, Majeed; Veroeveren, Pieter. "Asian Nations Cup 1968". RSSSF.

Qual
AFC Asian Cup qualification
Q
International association football competitions hosted by Myanmar